CRI Vila and Santo at 102 FM is a radio station in Vila, Solomon Islands and Santo, Vanuatu. It is part of China Radio International. The station broadcasts primarily in English.

External links
 Official website of 102 FM in Vila and Santo, 106 FM in Malakula

Radio stations in the Solomon Islands
Radio stations in Vanuatu
China Radio International